In Concert is a 1994 concert album by singer-songwriter Carole King.

Track listing
All songs by Carole King, except where noted.

Original vinyl / audio tape release
Side 1
 "Hard Rock Cafe"
 "Up on the Roof" (Gerry Goffin, King)
 "Smackwater Jack"
 "So Far Away"
 "Beautiful"
 "(You Make Me Feel Like A) Natural Woman" (Goffin, King, Jerry Wexler)
 "Hold Out for Love"
 "Will You Love Me Tomorrow (Gerry Goffin, King)

Side 2
 "Jazzman" (King, David Palmer)
 "It's Too Late" (King, Toni Stern)
 "Chains" (Goffin, King)
 "I Feel the Earth Move"
 "You've Got a Friend"
 "Loco-Motion (The)" (Goffin, King)
 "You've Got a Friend" (reprise)

Album credits

Personnel
Carole King – vocals, piano
Teddy Andreadis – keyboards, piano, harmonica, backing vocals
Bill Mason – additional keyboards
Rudy Guess – guitar, backing vocals
Slash – lead guitar
Danny Pelfrey – guitar, saxophone, flute, backing vocals
John Humphrey – bass
Jerry Angel – drums
Brie Howard Darling – percussion, backing vocals
Sherry Goffin – backing vocals
Linda Lawley – backing vocals
Voices of Jubilation – choir
David Crosby & Graham Nash – guest vocalists on "You've Got A Friend"
Technical
Rudy Guess: Producer
Bobby Summerfield: Mixing
Hilton Rosenthal: Executive Producer
Bernie Grundman: Mastering
Legal Representative: Emily Simon
Manager Label Operations: Magda Summerfield
Project Coordinator: Lorna Guess
Production Coordinator: Ivy Skoff
Larry Vigon: Art Direction
Brian Jackson: Design
Catherine Wessel: Photography

Tour crew
Joe Cardosi and Tim Bernett: Tour Managers
Lorna Guess: Assistant to Carole King
Graham Holmes and John Vanderslice: Production Managers
Chris Rankin: House Sound Engineer
Ron Reeves and Bernie Bernil: Monitor Engineers
Mike Ponczek and Jonathan Parke: Audio Technicians
Rob Zablow: Lighting Designer
Dennis Connors: Lighting Director
Sean Harvey and Jerry Swatek: Lighting Technicians
Alex Axotis: Lighting Operator
Danny de la Luz: Drum Technician
Jage Jackson, John Gonzales and Damen Kellihar: Guitar Technicians
Robbie Eagle and Scott Pinkerton: Keyboard Technicians
John Bennett: Head of Security
Beth O'Bryan: Wardrobe
Dale Lee, Dave Walters, Joe Folke, Bob Bodiglari: Bus Drivers
David Sutherland, Kenny Rich, Randy Johnson: Truck Drivers
Jaime Lennox: Alliance For The Wild Rockies Representative
Ira Koslow: Manager, Peter Asher Management
Brigette Barr: Project Coordinator, Peter Asher Management
Nick Men-Meir: Business Manager
Dan Weiner: Booking Agent, Monterey Peninsula Artists
Showco, Inc.: Sound Company
National Audio: Sound Company
Upstaging, Custom Coach West Busing: Trucking and Lighting
Ego Trips: Busing

Recording credits
Universal Amphitheatre – Los Angeles
Le Mobile
Guy Charbonneau: Recording Engineer
Dr. Dave Gallo: Stage Engineer
Charlie Bovis: Tape Operator
Eastman Theatre – Rochester, NY
Proctor's Theatre – Schenectady, NY
Bushnell Auditorium – Hartford, CT
Remote Recording Services, Inc.
David Hewitt: Recording Engineer
John McClintock: Stage Engineer
Phil Gitomer: Tape Operator
Plus 4 Recording Studios, Los Angeles
Bobby Summerfield: Post-Production and Mix Engineer

References

External links
Carole King Official Web Site 

Carole King live albums
1994 live albums
Valley Entertainment albums